North is a province in Guinea-Bissau.  It consists Biombo, Cacheu and Oio regions.

References 

Regions of Guinea-Bissau